Charles, Charlie or Charley Johnson may refer to:

Academics
 Charles Johnson (historian) (1870-1961), English historian and archivist
 Charles Willison Johnson (1863–1932), American naturalist
 Charles S. Johnson (1893–1956), African-American sociologist president of Fisk University
 Charles R. Johnson (born 1948), African-American scholar and author
 Charles Royal Johnson (born 1948), professor of mathematics
 Charles Willis Johnson, dean of the University of Washington Pharmacy Department

Arts and entertainment
 Charles Johnson (writer) (1679–1748), English playwright and poet
 Captain Charles Johnson, pseudonym of unknown English author of 1724 book, A General History of the Robberies and Murders of the Most Notorious Pyrates
 Charles Ellis Johnson (1857–1926), American photographer
 Charles Howard Johnson (1868–1896), American illustrator and newspaper artist
 Charles L. Johnson (1876–1950), composer of ragtime tunes
 Charlie Johnson (bandleader) (1891–1959), jazz musician and pianist
 Charles Johnson (1903–1974), American actor who used stage name Chubby Johnson
 Little Jody Rainwater (born Charles Edward Johnson, 1920–2011), bluegrass musician and radio personality
 Charles K. Johnson (1924–2001), American promoter and president of Flat Earth Society, 1972–2001
 Charlie Johnson, stage name of rock singer Charles Westover (1934–1990), a.k.a. Del Shannon
 Charles Foster Johnson (born 1953), jazz guitarist, blogger at Little Green Footballs

Politics
 Charles Johnson (North Carolina politician) (died 1802), Democratic-Republican politician who represented 8th congressional district
 Charles C. Johnson (born 1988), white supremacist activist and website operator
 Charles E. Johnson (government official) (born 1936), acting U.S. Secretary of Health and Human Services from January 2004 to April 2004
 Charles Elliott Johnson, Democratic Party politician from North Carolina; member of the General Assembly from 2003 to 2005
 Charles Fletcher Johnson (1859–1930), Democratic Party politician from Maine, U.S. Senator, and judge
 Charles G. Johnson (1880–1957), Californian state treasurer from 1923 to 1956
 Charles George Johnson (1886–1950), chemist, businessman, and political figure in Adelaide, South Australia
 Charles H. Johnson, member of the Californian state assembly from 1861 to 1862
 Charles Phillip Johnson (1836–1920), lieutenant governor of Missouri from 1873 to 1875
 Charles R. Johnson (California merchant) (1830–1904), American merchant and Los Angeles City Council member
 Charles W. Johnson (jurist) (born 1951), Associate Chief Justice of Washington State Supreme Court
 Charles William Johnson, Canadian politician
 Charles C. Johnson (politician) (born 1864), Michigan state representative

Sports

American football
 Charley Johnson (born 1938), quarterback
 Charles Johnson (arena football) (born 1983)
 Charles Johnson (defensive back) (born 1956), San Francisco 49ers and St. Louis Cardinals
 Charles Johnson (defensive end) (born 1986), Carolina Panthers
 Charlie Johnson (defensive tackle) (1952–2021), American NFL player
 Charles Johnson (defensive tackle) (born 1957), Green Bay Packers
 Charlie Johnson (offensive lineman) (born 1984), American football guard
 Charles Johnson (wide receiver, born 1972) (1972–2022) Pittsburgh Steelers
 Charles Johnson (wide receiver, born 1989), Orlando Apollos

Baseball
 Charlie Johnson (baseball) (1885–1940), outfielder for Philadelphia Phillies
 Charles Johnson (pitcher) (1909–2006), Negro leagues pitcher and outfielder
 Charles Johnson (catcher) (born 1971), 4 time Gold Glove Award catcher

Basketball
 Charles Johnson (basketball, born 1949) (1949–2007), NBA guard for Golden State Warriors
 Charles Johnson (basketball, born 1961) (born 1964), basketball coach
 Splinter Johnson (Charles Robert Johnson, 1920–2002), American professional basketball player

Other sports
 Charley Johnson (wrestler) (1887–1967), American Olympic wrestler
 Charles Johnson (cricketer) (died 1967), South African cricketer
 Charles Johnson (diver) (1913–2000), British Olympic diver

Other
 Charles Johnson (Royal Navy officer) (1869–1930), became Admiral Superintendent of Malta Dockyard
 Charles Christopher Johnson, British soldier
 Charles E. Johnson (FBI Most Wanted fugitive) (1907–?), American criminal
 Charles B. Johnson (born 1933), American businessman, co-chairman of Franklin Resources, owner of San Francisco Giants
 Charlie Johnson (pilot) (born 1942), Air force pilot, former president of Cessna Aircraft
 Charles Cooper Johnson (1827–1905), British Indian Army officer

See also
 Johnson Charles (born 1989), West Indies cricketer
 Charles Johnson Maynard (1845–1929), American naturalist, ornithologist, collector and taxidermist
 People with the surname Johnson
 Charles Johnston (disambiguation)
 Charles Johnstone (disambiguation)